Maitham Jabbar Mutlag Al-Farttoosi (born 10 November 2000) is an Iraqi footballer who plays as a defender for Al-Zawraa in the Iraqi Premier League.

International career
On 20 March 2019, Jabbar made his first international cap with Iraq against Syria in the 2019 International Friendship Championship.

Honours

Club
Al-Quwa Al-Jawiya
 Iraqi Premier League: 2020–21
 Iraq FA Cup: 2020–21

References

External links

2000 births
Living people
Iraqi footballers
Iraq international footballers
Al-Karkh SC players
Al-Quwa Al-Jawiya players
Iraqi Premier League players
People from Nasiriyah
Association football defenders